Beach volleyball competition has been in the Universiade in 2011 and 2013 as optional sport.

Events

Medal winners

Men

Women

Medal table 
Last updated after the 2013 Summer Universiade

References 
International Volleyball Federation
2011 Summer Universiade – Beach Volleyball
2013 Summer Universiade – Beach volleyball

 
Universiade